Pigasovo is a rural locality (a village) in Golovinskoye Rural Settlement, Sudogodsky District, Vladimir Oblast, Russia. The population was 4 as of 2010.

Geography 
Pigasovo is located 28 km southwest of Sudogda (the district's administrative centre) by road and Avdotyino is the nearest rural locality.

References 

Rural localities in Sudogodsky District